Brazil competed in 2015 Pan American Games in Toronto, Canada from July 10 to 26, 2015. The Brazilian Olympic Committee selected a team of 590 athletes, 314 men and 276 women. This is the 17th appearance of the country in the Pan American Games. The goal of the Brazilian Olympic Committee is to finish among top 3 countries on total medals, as part of preparations for the 2016 Summer Olympics, in Rio de Janeiro, and to surpass the number of medals of Guadalajara (141). Women's field hockey, baseball, racquetball and speed skating competitions will be the only sports without Brazilian representation at these games.

On July 4, 2015, the swimmer Thiago Pereira was named the flagbearer of the team during the opening ceremony. Pereira has already been the Brazilian flagbearer during the 2007 Pan American Games closing ceremony. Brazil's team competed in all sports except in racquetball.

Competitors
The following is the list of number of competitors participating in the Games. Note that reserves in fencing, field hockey, football, and handball are not counted as athletes:

Medalists
The following competitors from Brazil won medals at the games. In the by discipline sections below, medalists' names are bolded.

Archery

Brazil qualified two male and three female archers based on its performance at the 2014 Pan American Championships. Later Brazil qualified 1 more man based on its performance at the 2015 Copa Merengue. The team was named on 3 June 2015.

Men

Women

Athletics

Brazil has qualified 80 athletes in total (43 men and 37 women). The roster was announced on June 8, 2015.

Men
Track & road events

Field events

Combined events – Decathlon

Women
Track & road events

Field events

Combined events

Badminton

Brazil qualified a full team of eight athletes (four men and four women).
Men

Women

Mixed

Basketball

Brazil has qualified a men's and women's teams. Each team will consist of 12 athletes, for a total of 24.

Men

Group A

Women

Group A

Beach Volleyball

Brazil has qualified a men's and women's pair for a total of four athletes.

Bowling

Brazil has qualified 4 athletes (2 men and 2 women).

Singles

Pairs

Boxing

Brazil has qualified seven male boxers in the 52 kg, 56 kg, 64 kg, 69 kg, 81 kg, 91 kg and +91 kg men's categories and one female boxer in the 75 kg women's category.

Men

Women

Canoeing

Slalom
Brazil has qualified five boats and five athletes, 4 men and 1 women:

Sprint
Brazil has qualified 14 athletes in the sprint discipline (6 in men's kayak, 5 in women's kayak, 2 in men's canoe and 1 in women's canoe).

Men
Edson Isaias da Silva
Erlon Silva
Hans Mallmann
Isaquias Queiroz

Women
Beatriz Vergutz
Valdenice do Nascimento

Qualification Legend: QF = Qualify to final; QS = Qualify to semifinal

Cycling

Brazil has qualified 24 athletes: 14 men and 10 women.

BMX

Mountain

Road
Men

Women

Track
Men
Armando Camargo
Endrigo Pereira
Flávio Cipriano
Gideoni Monteiro
Hugo Osteti
Kacio Freitas
Thiago Nardin

Women
Gabriela Yumi Gomes
Wellyda Rodrigues

Diving

Brazil has qualified 8 athletes: 4 men and 4 women.

Men

Women

Equestrian

Brazil qualified the full quota of riders in all equestrian events (4 in dressage, 4 in eventing and 4 in show jumping).

Dressage

Eventing

Jumping

Legend: * = Did not pass horse inspection

Fencing

Brazil qualified 18 fencers (9 men, 9 women).

Men

Women

Field hockey

Brazil has qualified a men's team of 16 athletes. Although the country hosts the 2016 Summer Olympics the following year, it does not get an automatic spot for the dispute. In order to qualify, Brazil has to finish 6th place or higher at the Pan Am.

Men

Pool B

Football

Men

Brazil has qualified a men's team.

Squad

Andrey
Jacsson
Bressan
Luan
Gustavo Henrique
Euller
Gilberto
Tinga
Vinícius Freitas
Bruno Paulista
Barreto
Dodô
Eurico
Romulo
Clayton
Erik Lima
Lucas Piazon
Luciano

Group A

Women

Brazil has qualified a women's team of 18 athletes.

Squad

Andressa Alves
Andressa Machry
Bárbara
Cristiane
Darlene
Érika
Fabiana
Gabi Zanotti
Luciana
Maurine
Formiga
Mônica
Poliana
Rafinha
Rafaelle
Raquel
Tamires
Thaisa

Group B

Golf

Brazil qualified two male and two female golfers. The team was named on May 20, 2015.

Gymnastics

Brazil has qualified 20 gymnasts.

Artistic
Brazil qualified 10 athletes. The men's team was named on June 26 and the women's team on June 30, 2015.

Men
Team & Individual Qualification

Petrix Barbosa (reserve)

Qualification Legend: Q = Qualified to apparatus final

Individual Finals

Women
Team & Individual Qualification

Jade Barbosa (reserve)

Qualification Legend: Q = Qualified to apparatus final

Individual Finals

Rhythmic
Brazil has qualified a full team of eight gymnasts (six in group and two in individual).

Individual

Qualification Legend: Q = Qualified to apparatus final

Group

Handball

Brazil has qualified a men's and women's teams. Each team will consist of 15 athletes, for a total of 30.

Men

Group A

Women

Group A

Judo

Brazil has qualified a full team of fourteen judokas (seven men and seven women).

Men

Women

Karate

Brazil has qualified 3 male and 4 female athletes.

Men

Women

Modern pentathlon

Brazil has qualified 5 athletes, 2 male and 3 female pentathletes.

Roller sports

Figure skating
Brazil has qualified one male and one female figure skater.

Rowing

Brazil has qualified 12 boats and 21 rowers, 16 men and 5 women.

Men
Ailson Eráclito
Thiago Pereira Carvalho
Renato Cataldo
Thiago Almeida
Guilherme Gomes
David Faria
Diego Nazário
Emmanuel Dantas
Pedro Meirelles
Victor Ruzicki
Maciel Costa
Allan Bittencourt
Leandro Tozzo
Vinícius Delazeri
Gabriel Campos
Maurício Abreu

Women
Fabiana Beltrame
Sophia Câmara Py
Caroline Corado
Yanka Britto
Gabriella Salles

Qualification Legend: FA or F=Final A (medal); FB=Final B (non-medal); R=Repechage

Rugby sevens

Brazil has qualified a men's and women's teams for a total of 24 athletes (12 men and 12 women).

Men

Group B

Quarterfinals

Women

Sailing

Men

Women

Mixed

Open

Shooting

Brazil has qualified 19 shooters, 13 men and 6 women.

Men
Bruno Heck
Cassio Rippel
Eduardo Corrêa
Emerson Duarte
Iosef Forma
Jaison Santin
Leonardo Moreira
Luiz Fernando da Graça
Renato Portela
Rodrigo Bastos
Stênio Yamamoto

Women

Softball

Brazil has qualified a women's of 15 athletes.

Women

Group A

Semifinals

Squash

Brazil has qualified 3 squash players (all women).

Women

Swimming

Brazil has qualified 35 athletes total, 18 men and 17 women:

Men

Women

Synchronized swimming

Brazil has qualified a full team of nine athletes.

Table tennis

Brazil has qualified a men's and women's team.

Men

Women

Taekwondo

Brazil has qualified a full team of eight athletes (four men and four women).

Men

Women

Tennis

Brazil has qualified a full team of six athletes (three men and three women).

Men

Women

Mixed

Trampoline

Brazil has qualified 2 athletes.

Triathlon

Brazil has qualified a full triathlon team.

Men

Women

Volleyball

Brazil has qualified a men's and women's volleyball team, for a total of 24 athletes (12 men and 12 women).

Men

Group A

Semifinals

Gold medal match

Women

Team

Group B

|}

Semifinals

|}

Gold medal match

|}

Water polo

Brazil has qualified a men's and women's teams. Each team will consist of 13 athletes, for a total of 26.

Men

Group B

Semifinals

Gold medal match

Women

Group B

Semifinals

Bronze medal match

Water skiing

Brazil qualified 2 male athletes.

Weightlifting

Brazil has qualified a team of 8 athletes. The weightlifters was selected during the Brazilian trials on 22 May 2015.

Wrestling

Brazil has qualified so far 5 female and 4 male athletes:

Freestyle

Greco-Roman

See also
Brazil at the 2016 Summer Olympics

References

Nations at the 2015 Pan American Games
P
2015